In computing, X-Win32 is a proprietary implementation of the X Window System for Microsoft Windows, produced by StarNet Communications. It is based on X11R7.4.

X- Win32 allows remote display of UNIX windows on Windows machines in a normal window alongside the other Windows applications

Version History

X-Win32 was first introduced by StarNet Communications as a product called MicroX in 1991.  As the internet became more widely used in the 1990s the name changed to X-Win32.  The table below details the origination and transformation of MicroX into X-Win32.

A limited set of versions and their release notes are available from the product's website.

Features 
 Standard connection protocols - X-Win32 offers six standard connection protocols: ssh, telnet, rexec, rlogin, rsh, and XDMCP
 Window modes - Like other X servers for Microsoft Windows, X-Win32 has two window modes, Single and Multiple. Single window mode contains all X windows with one large visible root window. Multiple window mode allows the Microsoft Window Manager to manage the X client windows 
 Copy and paste - X-Win32 incorporates a clipboard manager which allows for dynamic copying and pasting of text from X clients to Windows applications and vice versa. A screen-shot tool saves to a PNG file.
 OpenGL support - X-Win32 uses the GLX extension which allows for OpenGL Support

Related products 
 X-Win32 Flash is a version of X-Win32 that can be installed and run directly from a USB Flash Drive

Discontinued products 
X-Win64 was a version for 64-bit Windows, but the extended features in that version can now be found in the current version of X-Win32.
X-Win32 LX was a free commercially supported X Server for Microsoft Windows which supported Microsoft Windows Services for UNIX (SFU).
Recon-X was an add-on product for all X server products, including X-Win32 competitors such as Exceed and Reflection X, which added suspend and resume capabilities to running X sessions.  Features of Recon-X were incorporated into the LIVE product line
LinuxLIVE is a LIVE client for Linux systems
MacLIVE is a LIVE client for Mac OS X systems
LIVE Console is a LIVE client installed with the LIVE server which allows localhost LIVE connections to be made

See also 
Cygwin/X - A free alternative
Exceed - A commercial alternative
Reflection X - A commercial alternative
Xming - Donations or purchase required

References

External links
 X-Win32 (product home page)

X servers